Baqiabad (also Romanized as Bāqīābād; also known as Bākīābād) is a village in Khamir Rural District, in the Central District of Khamir County, Hormozgan Province, Iran. At the 2006 census, its population was 50, in 12 families.

References 

Populated places in Khamir County